Stephen Jeffrey Wilson (born 1959 or 1960) is an American businessman and politician of the Republican Party. In 2020, he was elected to the Washington State Senate to represent the 19th legislative district and took office on January 11, 2021. Wilson is also a Port of Longview commissioner.

References

External links 
 Jeff Wilson at ballotpedia.org
 Jeff Wilson at washingtonvotes.org

1960s births
Year of birth uncertain
Living people
21st-century American politicians
People from Ilwaco, Washington
Republican Party Washington (state) state senators